Enzo Benítez (born 14 September 1995) is an Argentine professional footballer who plays as a midfielder for Deportivo Baigorrita.

Career
Benítez started out in the system of Los Andes. He was an unused substitute seven times in Primera B Nacional across the 2015 and 2016 seasons, prior to leaving the club on loan on 28 February 2017 to Jorge Newbery. Benítez returned to Los Andes later that year, subsequently making his professional bow in a 2–2 draw with Instituto on 7 July; another appearance followed against San Martín on 17 July. In July 2019, having departed Los Andes, Benítez joined Liga Deportiva del Oeste side Deportivo Baigorrita.

Career statistics
.

References

External links

1995 births
Living people
People from Lomas de Zamora
Argentine footballers
Association football midfielders
Primera Nacional players
Club Atlético Los Andes footballers
Sportspeople from Buenos Aires Province